Lahore Zoo (Punjabi:) in Lahore, Punjab, Pakistan, established in 1872, one of the largest zoos in Pakistan. It is currently managed by the Forest, Wildlife and Fisheries department of the Government of Pakistan. Today the zoo houses a collection of about 1378 animals of 135 species. Lahore Zoo was the host of the fifth annual conference of SAZARC in 2004.

Lahore Zoo is third oldest zoo in the world. House of Vienna Zoo of Austria, established in 1752 as a menagerie, was opened to public as a zoo in 1779. London Zoo of England, established in 1828, was opened to public in 1847. The Alipore Zoo of India, established some time in the early 19th century, was opened to public as a zoo in 1876.

History

Lahore Zoo had its beginnings in a small aviary donated by Lal Mahundra Ram in 1872 to the Lahore Municipal Corporation. Over time the animal collection increased and the zoo expanded. It later began to take interest in conservation, education and research in addition to providing recreational facilities to the public. By 2010, the zoo was home to about 1280 trees of 71 species and 1380 animals of 136 species including 996 birds of 82 species, 49 reptiles of 8 and 336 mammals of 45 species.

The zoo was managed by the Lahore Municipal Corporation from 1872 to 1923, when management was turned over to the Deputy Commissioner of Lahore. Management was transferred to the Livestock and Dairy Development department in 1962, and then to the Wildlife and Parks department in 1982. Between its founding in 1872 and its turnover to the Wildlife and Parks department in 1982 there was very little development at the zoo. Since 1982, it has upgraded its exhibits, layout, and landscaping, and has become a self-financing organization.

A master planning, improvement and development project of 18 months duration was approved in on July 25, 2005. It was carried out by 'Zoo Maintenance Committee' and sponsored by Planning and Development Department of Government of Punjab. The project cost around 202.830 million Pakistani rupees and aimed for the improvement and addition of facilities.

Areas and attractions

Fancy Birds Aviary 
Located just east of the zoo's main entrance, this is the oldest section of the zoo, as the zoo itself started out as an aviary in 1872. It is home to most of the zoo's gamebirds and parrots. The area consists of four rows of double-sided bird cages housing peafowl, pheasants, partridges, western crowned pigeons and various species of parrots including macaws, grey parrots and conures, among others. Located at the eastern end of this section are a row of enclosures housing a pack of Asiatic jackals, juvenile spur-thighed tortoises and Asian houbara. Nearby is a small enclosure, once home to smooth-coated otters, housing Indian flapshell turtles and red-eared sliders, this enclosure also acts as temporary holding pen for the zoo's juvenile mugger crocodiles.

Lion House 
Originally constructed in 1872, the current Lion House complex, covering an area of 24,500 square feet was built in 1987 at a cost of 5.1 million rupees and was renovated in 2012. It comprises three concrete buildings with indoor cages and each building have two adjoining outdoor enclosures. The first of these buildings is home to the zoo's Bengal tigers and pumas. Lahore Zoo currently has fifteen tigers and three pumas, most of which have been born at the zoo. The second building, consisting of three indoor compartments and two outdoor enclosures, houses the zoo's lions. From the 2015 to 2016 13 lion cubs were born at the zoo, currently the zoo is home to more than 20 lions. The third, and final, building is home to the zoo's family of black bears. The zoo's resident black bear pair has given birth to two litters of two cubs, born in 2009 and 2011, all of which currently reside at the zoo. This is the only enclosure in the Lion House that does not have indoor viewing for visitors.

Elephant House 
Constructed in 1972 at a cost of 500,000 rupees, this is one of the most popular attractions of the zoo. It consists of three large indoor rooms each with adjoining outdoor paddocks. Originally housing three endangered pachyderm species native to Africa, The African bush elephant, the Southern white rhinoceros, and  the hippopotamus, it currently houses a female hippo, Rani, that was brought to the zoo in July 2006 and a male white rhinoceros. The zoo's only elephant, Suzi, which had been resident at the zoo since 1988 died in May, 2017, from several illnesses, leaving the zoo without an elephant. The zoo's male hippo, Raja, was brought to the zoo in 1974 and at the time of his death, in October, 2015, was the oldest resident of the zoo, at 51. There had been attempts by the zoo administration to breed hippos but these had failed due to Raja's old age. The zoo's female white rhino, Kawo, died in 2014 on account of old age.

Monkey House 
Constructed in 2012 over the zoo's previous out of date monkey house, these four new enclosure are located just west of the zoo's main entrance of main gate. The first enclosure houses the zoo's olive baboon family, currently numbering around nine individuals. The next two enclosure houses a pair of tufted capuchins and mantled guerezas. The final enclosure is home to a family of vervet monkeys. Housed, in nearby enclosures, are the zoo's family of porcupines, adult spur-thighed tortoises and a pair of smooth-coated otters. Species previously housed in the Monkey House include black-footed grey langurs, mandrills and spider monkeys.

Chimpanzee House 
Home to the zoo's chimpanzees, this building houses a wide array of other species including wolves, swamp cats and rhesus macaques. The zoo's first pair of chimps, male Romeo and female Julie, had been brought in 1994. A male chimp, Tinku was born to the pair in 2000 but died due to pneumonia in September, 2004. In August, 2001, Julie gave birth to two female chimps, named Pinky and Honey. Romeo died, also of pneumonia, in 2008. Juliet succumbed to hepatitis in 2012 and Pinky died in 2014, leaving Honey the only chimpanzee left at the zoo. This building also acts as a temporary holding area for various species of cats, including leopards, lions and pumas. Species previously housed here include cheetahs and baboons.

Waterfowl Lake 
Located south of the Fancy Aviary, this lake houses various species of waterfowl and wading birds. It consists of four islands with some of the oldest trees in the zoo. Located adjacent to the enclosure is a banyan tree that is reported to be over 400 years old. Species housed in this part of the zoo include black swans, Muscovy ducks, lesser flamingos and Dalmatian pelicans. Located nearby is a small enclosure housing a pair of wild boars.

Reptile House 
This building houses most of the zoo's reptiles, including Indian cobras, Sindh kraits, saw-scaled vipers and Indian pythons. The Reptile House was renovated in 2006, providing better ventilation to the exhibits and air conditioning for the animals. Other animals housed include guinea pigs. A small taxidermy museum, displaying various species of animals that previously lived at the zoo, is also present in the building.

Walk-through Aviary 
Located directly east of the Reptile House, the three-domed walk-through aviary is relatively new construction. Entry to the aviary is not included in general admission ticket of the zoo. Species housed in this enclosure include various species of pheasants, Indian peafowl and demoiselle cranes. As of 2015 the Walk-through Aviary was not open to the public.

Chimpanzee Island 
This is a large moated enclosure located south of the waterfowl lake that was originally created to house the zoo's chimpanzee, but because of deaths of all but one of the chimpanzees, this enclosure currently houses a pair of Himalayan brown bears.

Urial hillock 
Located on west of, and right in front of the entrance to, the Reptile House, is a small naturally created hill that is home to urials and mouflons held in two separate enclosures.

Others 
Other notable animals found at Lahore Zoo include giraffes, mugger crocodiles, blackbucks, nilgais, red deer, hog deer, guanacos, plains zebra, ostrich, emus and southern cassowary, vulturine guineafowl.

Exotic flora
Lahore Zoo has about 1280 trees of 71 species. Many of the exotic species have information boards to promote education. Some of these are listed below:

Alstonia scholaris - locally termed ditabark - native to India and Pakistan
Bombax ceiba- sunbal or silk cotton tree - native to Himalayas
Callistemon citrinus - bottle brush - native to Australia
Dalbergia sissoo - shisham - native to India and Pakistan
Delonix regia - gulmohar - native to Madagascar
Erythrina suberosa - coral or gul nister - native to Myanmar
Ficus benghalensis - banyan - native to Bangladesh
Ficus religiosa - pipal - native to India and Pakistan
Ficus retusa - bobari - native to Malaysia
Kigelia africana - gul-e-fanoos or sausage - native to Africa
Livistona chinensis - bottle palm - native to China
Mangifera indica - aam - native to India and Pakistan
Mimusops elengi - molsery - native to Pakistan
Pongamia pinnata - sukh chayn or Indian beech - native to Himalayas
Syzygium cumini - jamu - native to India and Pakistan
Ziziphus zizyphus - jujube - native to Himalayas

Safari park

Lahore Zoo Safari was opened on January 21, 2009, a renovation of Lahore Wildlife Park (also called Woodland Wildlife Park) which was established in 1982. The species housed here include Indian peafowl, Bengal tiger, common pheasant, emu, lion, mute swan, nilgai, ostrich and silver pheasant among a few others. The wildlife park is now considered to be an extension of Lahore Zoo.

The Government of Pakistan turned management of the wildlife park over to the Zoo Maintenance Committee headed by the chairman of the Punjab branch of the Wildlife & Parks department. Vice-chairman Tauqeer Shah said this transfer of control was due to poor previous management that was not working to improve the park. A ticket system was introduced in the wildlife park so that the Lahore Zoo Safari could become a semi-autonomous, self-financed organization.

Species list

Aves

Accipitriformes
Black kite
Common kestrel
Golden eagle
Steppe eagle
White-eyed buzzard
Anseriformes
Bar-headed goose
Black swan
Common shelduck
Common teal
Eurasian wigeon
Gadwall
Greater white-fronted goose
Greylag goose (domestic goose)
Mallard
Muscovy duck
Mute swan
New Zealand scaup
Red shoveler
Ruddy shelduck
Wood duck
Columbiformes
Rock pigeon
Black Sherazi pigeon
Indian Fantail pigeon
Western crowned pigeon
Galliformes
Black partridge
Chukar partridge
Common pheasant
Emerald peafowl  hybrid of green peafowl and Indian peafowl
Golden pheasant
Yellow pheasant (mutation)
Green peafowl
Grey francolin
Grey partridge
Indian peafowl
Black shouldered peafowl
Common blue peafowl
Pied peafowl
White peafowl
Silver pheasant
Swinhoe's pheasant
Vulturine guineafowl
Wild turkey
Gruiformes
Demoiselle crane
Eurasian coot
Houbara bustard
Pelecaniformes
Dalmatian pelican
Great white pelican
Phoenicopteriformes
Greater flamingo
Lesser flamingo
Psittaciformes
Grey parrot
Alexandrine parakeet
Blossom-headed parakeet
Blue-and-yellow macaw
Budgerigar
Cape parrot
Cockatiel
Green-winged macaw
Lilian's lovebird
Panama amazon
Rose-ringed parakeet
Sulphur-crested cockatoo
Strigiformes
Indian eagle-owl
Struthioniformes
Emu
Ostrich
Southern cassowary

Mammals

Artiodactyla
Bactrian camel (1)
Blackbuck
Chinkara (Indian gazelle)
Chital (axis deer) (7)
Fallow deer
Giraffe
Hippopotamus (1)
Hog deer
Llama
Guanaco
Nilgai
Ovis orientalis
Mouflon (O. orientalis orientalis)
Urial (O. orientalis vignei)
Red deer
Sambar
Sika deer
Wild boar
Carnivora
Asian black bear (4)
Brown bear
Bengal tiger
Cougar (puma) (2)
Indian wolf (3)
Jungle cat (1)
Leopard (2)
Lion (16)
Smooth-coated otter (2)
Lagomorpha
Domestic rabbit
Marsupials
Red-necked wallaby
Perissodactyla
Plains zebra
White rhinoceros (1)
Primates
Mantled guereza
Tufted capuchin
Chimpanzee (3)
Olive baboon
Rhesus macaque
Vervet monkey
Proboscidea
African bush elephant (1)
Rodentia
Indian crested porcupine

Reptiles

Crocodilia
Mugger crocodile
Squamata
Central Asian cobra (brown cobra)
Common krait
Diadem snake (rat snake)
Enhydris - unidentified (water snake)
Indian cobra (spectacled cobra)
Indian python
Indian sand boa
Russell's viper
Saw-scaled viper
Testudines
Red-eared slider
Spur-thighed tortoise

Public service
Instruction boards, maps and sign boards are placed around the zoo for guidance and education. The zoo includes a mosque for Muslim prayers. In 2008, walk ways, the cafeteria, and public washrooms were renovated and umbrella benches, drinking water coolers and new waste bins were added as part of some basic infrastructure updates.

Recreation
Camel rides and electronic kiddy rides are available for children. Lahore Zoo also has plenty of areas for visitors to picnic. A waterfall was created for visitors, and statues of various animals have been placed within the boundaries of the zoo.

Education 
The education officer of Lahore Zoo is Kiran Saleem. The zoo hosts guided tours for school groups, as well as placing information boards about the animals and plants around the zoo. A touch table has been set up to let children to touch animal parts like skins, horns, feathers and eggs that they cannot otherwise see or feel. The zoo has also prepared brochures and posters about endangered species in Pakistan like Ganges and Indus river dolphin.

On September 5, 2009, Lahore Zoo celebrated the International Vulture Awareness Day and distributed posters regarding the importance of vultures in ecosystems. Reasons of sharp decline of populations of Indian white-rumped vulture were made known to local people.

In 2010, Lahore Zoo celebrated events like World Environment Day on June 5 and World Animal Day on October 4. This particular and colorful event was organized by the students of Zoology department, University of the Punjab, Lahore. The students (BS.hons Batch 2010-14) participated actively to arrange for the event in the supervision of their course instructor, former Education officer of Lahore Zoo, Bushra Nisar Khan.

In November 2010, Lahore Zoo started its first publication, a quarterly newsletter. It is said to be the part of the education and awareness programme.

Research facilities 
The Lahore Zoo, with the assistance of its education office in particular, provides research facilities and supports relevant studies at the zoo. Scores of students from University of Veterinary and Animal Sciences and University of the Punjab work in collaboration with Lahore Zoo to complete their research projects and internships. As a prime example, the zoo provided direct assistance to a research project with the kind approval of Director General Wildlife and Parks Department, Punjab. The study was conducted by a BS.Hons student of Department of Zoology, University of the Punjab. The researcher, Sana Ahmed, presented her synopsis as to study the public perception about the zoo and the role it plays to enhance the visitors' experience. The study included a survey from more than 200 zoo visitors, questioning them about different zoo facilities, animal species kept at zoo and about their experiences and suggestions. The study provided a useful insight to how visitors perceive the zoo. Likewise, it helped the zoo in shaping future strategies to design and launch interactive public awareness campaigns about ex-situ conservation. The research paper was presented in the National conference and training workshop of Wildlife and Aerobiology, held at University of the Punjab, Lahore. The researcher, first author of the paper (co-author of 3 other papers) got her paper publish in The Journal of Animal and Plant Sciences under the title, "The Study of Public Perception for Captive Animals at Lahore Zoo, Pakistan."

Gift shop
In 2005, a gift shop was opened in joint collaboration between Pakistan branch of WWF and the Lahore Zoo. Ali Bokhari, the marketing head of WWF-Pakistan, stated that the profit earned would be split in half between the Lahore Zoo and WWF-Pakistan. Lahore Zoo would make souvenirs from the profit which would be on sale at the shop, while the WWF would invest it on the conservation of nature in Pakistan. The products include shirts, mugs, plush toys, posters, caps and bags among many others.

Breeding efforts
Asian black bear: In September 2009, a rescued female was given to Lahore Zoo by World Wide Fund for Nature. Lahore Zoo was successful in breeding the species when twins were born in early January 2010. The cubs, however, went missing on 17 January.
Chimpanzee: A pair (named 'Romeo', the male and 'Juliet', the female) were brought to the zoo in 1994. They gave birth to a male named 'Tinku' in April 2000, another female named 'Pinky' in 2004 and a female named 'Honey' in April 2005. In October 2004, the Wildlife Department of Pakistan told the Daily Times that the four-year-old 'Tinku' had died some time in early August from pneumonia. On September 17, 2008, Romeo died at the age of 21 from a prolonged illness.
Hippopotamus: A six-year-old male hippopotamus was brought to the zoo on January 16, 1974. On July 11, 2006, zoo bought a six-year-old female to mate with the male that has been at the zoo for over three decades. An expert said that this was pointless because the male had passed its reproductive stage. Raja died on October 25, 2015. 
Gharial: In November 2004, Lahore Zoo exchanged animals with Karachi Zoo including a male gharial. Lahore Zoo already had three female gharials and with a male, it could initiate a conservation attempt. The male was transported by truck to the zoo, but died the day after it was transferred. Currently there are only two female gharials at the zoo.
Leopard: On 18 January 2006, zoo officials said that a seven-year-old female wild leopard was caught at Muree and brought to Lahore Zoo for breeding. However, it died about a month later on 21 February because of nervousness. On 5 April 2009, it was reported that 3 leopards (black panthers; one male and two female) purchased in February 2009 had to be returned because they had become sick. Currently Lahore Zoo houses only two leopards.

Plans
On December 8, 2010, it was announced that the administration of Lahore Zoo is planning to make Reema Khan, an actress, as the ambassador of wildlife in captivity. Current zoo director, Iqbal Khalid, told Dawn News that Khan will help create awareness among citizens about wildlife issues. It was also revealed, that Lahore Zoo will start renting exotic animals from other countries. This will give a chance to local people to learn more about different animals across the globe. Lahore Zoo plans to rent two giant pandas from People's Republic of China. "Once it gets a sponsor, the zoo administration will submit a request to the Chinese government for the animal, which is popular around the world. Chinese officials will visit the zoo to inspect housing and health facilities for pandas," said Khalid.

In September 2015, the Lahore Zoo administration announced plans to bring 19 new animals in order to maintain a healthy gene pool in the zoo. Zoo director Hassan Ali Sukhaira also stated that veterinary lab, with pathological and hematological labs, treatment rooms and an ICU, will be established at the zoo. The first of these new animals, a trio of giraffes, arrived at the zoo on 26 June 2018.

Controversies
The plight of captive animals at Lahore Zoo, has been subject to criticism by local animal rights activists.

Safety and security concerns
On 21 November 1999, an Asian black bear killed an 18-month-old boy named Abdullah in the zoo. The child, who was with his parents, tried to shake hands with the caged animal. The bear pulled the boy into the cage and tore him apart. An angry crowd tried to kill the animal but the police intervened to bring the situation under control. Zoo officials blamed the parents for allowing the boy to touch the animal. On 8 January 2004, an attendant at the zoo was attacked by a red fox when its cage was left unlocked, causing a panic among visitors. On 9 April 2007, two stray dogs entered an Indian peafowl pen from a broken portion of a fence and managed to kill about 28 peafowl. This resulted in criticism as Indian peafowl is considered sacred in Indian subcontinent. On 10 May 2009, it was reported that a new born macaw was stolen from the zoo. The zoo director said that someone from the zoo staff must have been responsible. On 17 January 2010, two Asian black bear cubs went missing from the zoo.

Animal deaths
Lahore Zoo has been criticized for not having the level of medical facilities expected in a modern zoo. Zoo officials reported in April 2005 that three female black-footed gray langurs died due to cold weather the previous winter. In November 2005, a male mandrill and male puma died at the zoo. A female Asian black bear died in mid-February 2006. In September 2006, some animals at the zoo were diagnosed with tuberculosis, which can also be transmitted to humans, but early detection and treatment prevented an outbreak. In January 2009, a female giraffe was attacked by a plains zebra and died soon after due to injuries.

In October 2004 the Wildlife Department of Pakistan told the Daily Times that a four-year-old male chimpanzee had died in early August from pneumonia, but zoo management had not revealed this news to public immediately. In September 2008, another male chimpanzee died at the age of 21 from a prolonged unidentified illness.

Lahore Zoo received a pair of Bengal tigers from Belgium in 1992 to start their captive breeding program. In 1997, six Bengal tigers died from Trypanosomiasis at the zoo, and in 2006, four more became victims. In July 2007, two female Bengal tigers, one of which had given the zoo 19 cubs, died from same disease. In early May 2009, a 3-year-old female Bengal tiger died after a cesarean section to take out her dead babies. In April 2009, a Bengal tiger gave birth to four In July 2009, a lion gave birth to two cubs but killed them by eating their heads. Director, Zafar Shah, said that the lion had been killing her cubs for the last three years and is a victim of cannibalism - a mental disease found in 5-6% of lions worldwide. At Lahore Zoo, there have been many births of Bengal tiger cubs who are deformed and do not survive long. In late 2010, the officials showed concern for the issue of inbreeding that might be the reason behind these deaths.

In early November 2010, Lahore Zoo received 53 falcons which were being illegally transported to Qatar from Benazir Bhutto International Airport. 16 falcons died due to heat strokes and other reasons. In April 2011, the zoo officials returned the remaining falcons to the wildlife department to be set free so that they can migrate to colder regions.

Smuggling scandal
On 27 March 2009, two white Bengal tigers were brought into Pakistan from Indonesia without necessary import documents and sold to the Lahore Zoo. The sources said that trans-boundary movement of the rare and endangered species was controlled by the CITES and that a certificate of permission from CITES and permission from the Islamabad-based National Council for Conservation of Wildlife (NCCW) were both required before import of the animals. Lahore Zoo had neither. The director of the zoo, Yusuf Paul said the zoo had purchased two female white Bengal tigers from supplier Mohammad Afzal of a Lahore-based organisation, Animal World, for 7.6 million Pakistani rupees.

See also 
 List of zoos in Pakistan
 List of parks and gardens in Lahore
 List of parks and gardens in Pakistan

References

External links

Lahore Zoo
Lahore
Zoos in Pakistan
Tourist attractions in Lahore
1872 establishments in India
The Mall, Lahore